Data laundering is the conversion of stolen data so that it may be sold or used by ostensibly legitimate databases.  ZDNet has described the process as "obscuring, removing, or fabricating the provenance of illegally obtained data such that it may be used for lawful purposes".

References

Data